Pedro Ferreira-Mendes (born May 13, 1990) is a Brazilian footballer who most recently played for Puerto Rico FC of the North American Soccer League. He has previously played for the Atlanta Silverbacks, Indy Eleven, and Minnesota United FC in the NASL.

Career

Club
In December 2013, Mendes signed for North American Soccer League side Indy Eleven. On August 15, 2014, Ferreira-Mendes moved from Indy Eleven to fellow NASL side Minnesota United FC.
On July 8, 2015, Mendes signed, along with his twin brother Paulo, with the Atlanta Silverbacks.

Mendes was released by Puerto Rico FC at the end of their 2016 season.

Career statistics

Club

References

External links

1990 births
Living people
Brazilian footballers
Brazilian expatriate footballers
Cal FC players
Atlanta Silverbacks players
Indy Eleven players
Minnesota United FC (2010–2016) players
Expatriate soccer players in the United States
North American Soccer League players
National Premier Soccer League players
Puerto Rico FC players
Association football forwards
Sportspeople from Goiânia